The Veterans Memorial Bridge is a Reinforced Concrete Arch Bridge that carries Pennsylvania Route 61 and Pennsylvania Route 147 across the Susquehanna River near Sunbury, Pennsylvania. It is 6,657 feet long and was constructed from June 1929 to September 1930 at a cost of $2,484,000.

Notes

References

Bridges over the Susquehanna River
Monuments and memorials in Pennsylvania
Bridges in Northumberland County, Pennsylvania
Bridges in Snyder County, Pennsylvania
Road bridges in Pennsylvania